Lucas Ariel Boyé (born 28 February 1996) is an Argentine professional footballer who plays as a striker for Spanish La Liga club Elche and the Argentina national team.

Club career

Early career
Boyé was called up by Ramon Diaz for River Plate's pre-season in Salta in January 2014. His unofficial debut took place on 29 January 2014 in a friendly against San Lorenzo de Almagro at the Estadio Padre Ernesto Martearena in Salta, when he replaced Jonathan Fabbro 23 minutes into the second half. River Plate lost the match to San Lorenzo 3–1.

Soon after he returned to play for the first team in another friendly, this time against the provincial team of San Luis, entering at the beginning of the second half to replace Daniel Villalba in a match which River Plate won 3–1. He made his official debut against Ferro in the final tournament of the 2013–14 Copa Argentina, in a match which River Plate won 6–5 in a penalty shootout.

His debut in the Argentine Primera División came in a 1–1 tie against Gimnasia y Esgrima on the first day of the 2014 Torneo de Transición.  Four days later, on 31 August, Boyé scored his first goal in the Primera División off an assist from Tomas Martinez, the third in a match which River won 3–1 against San Lorenzo.

Torino
On 1 February 2016, he signed a contract with Italian club Torino for four seasons, starting in July 2016.

Loan deals
On 31 January 2018, he moved on loan to Spanish club Celta.

In the 2018–19 season Boyé joined AEK on loan. On 28 October 2018 he scored his first goal for the club in a 4–0 home win game against Aris Thessaloniki. On 23 February 2019, he scored a brace, his first in his career, sealing a 2–1 home win game against Apollon Smyrnis.

On 2 August 2019, English Championship club Reading announced the signing of Boyé on a season-long loan deal from Torino. He scored his first goal for Reading in an EFL Cup tie against Wolverhampton Wanderers on 25 September 2019. However he also went on to miss a penalty in the shootout in the same game as Reading ultimately lost.

On 21 September 2020, the newly promoted La Liga team Elche announced that Boyé had joined them on loan with an option to buy.

Elche
On 13 May 2021, Elche announced that they had exercised the option to Boyé.

Style of play
Nicknamed El Tanque (The Tank) or El Toro (The Bull), Boyé is described as a well structured, yet agile centre forward, with excellent technique and dribbling ability. He is noted for his work rate and willingness to sacrifice himself for the team. He is compared to former Roma forward Abel Balbo.

Career statistics

Club

International

Honours
River Plate
Copa Libertadores: 2015
Copa Sudamericana: 2014
Recopa Sudamericana: 2015
Suruga Bank Championship: 2015
Copa Euroamericana: 2015

References

External links
 
 

Living people
1996 births
Association football forwards
Argentine footballers
Argentine expatriate footballers
Club Atlético River Plate footballers
Newell's Old Boys footballers
Torino F.C. players
RC Celta de Vigo players
AEK Athens F.C. players
Reading F.C. players
Elche CF players
Argentine Primera División players
Serie A players
La Liga players
Super League Greece players
Argentine expatriate sportspeople in Italy
Argentine expatriate sportspeople in Spain
Argentine expatriate sportspeople in Greece
Argentine expatriate sportspeople in England
Expatriate footballers in Italy
Expatriate footballers in Spain
Expatriate footballers in Greece
Expatriate footballers in England